Malta participated in the Eurovision Song Contest 2009 with the song "What If We" written by Marc Paelinck and Gregory Bilsen. The song was performed by Chiara, who had previously represented Malta at the Eurovision Song Contest in the 1998 and 2005 edition where she achieved third and second place with the songs "The One That I Love" and "Angel", respectively. The Maltese entry for the 2009 contest in Moscow, Russia was selected through the national final GO Malta EuroSong 2009, organised by the Maltese broadcaster Public Broadcasting Services (PBS). The competition consisted of a semi-final round and a final, held between 8 November 2008 and 7 February 2009, where "What If We" performed by Chiara eventually emerged as the winning entry after gaining 46% of the public televote.

Malta was drawn to compete in the first semi-final of the Eurovision Song Contest which took place on 12 May 2009. Performing during the show in position 17, "What If We" was announced among the 10 qualifying entries of the first semi-final and therefore qualified to compete in the final on 16 May. It was later revealed that Malta placed sixth out of the 18 participating countries in the semi-final with 86 points. In the final, Malta performed in position 14 and placed twenty-second out of the 25 participating countries, scoring 31 points.

Background

Prior to the 2009 contest, Malta had participated in the Eurovision Song Contest twenty-one times since its first entry in 1971. Malta briefly competed in the Eurovision Song Contest in the 1970s before withdrawing for sixteen years. The country had, to this point, competed in every contest since returning in 1991. Malta's best placing in the contest thus far was second, which it achieved on two occasions: in 2002 with the song "7th Wonder" performed by Ira Losco and in the 2005 contest with the song "Angel" performed by Chiara. In the 2008 edition, Malta failed to qualify to the final with the song "Vodka" performed by Morena.

For the 2009 contest, the Maltese national broadcaster, Public Broadcasting Services (PBS), broadcast the event within Malta and organised the selection process for the nation's entry. PBS confirmed their intentions to participate at it on 3 June 2008. Malta selected their entry consistently through a national final procedure, a method that was continued for their 2009 participation.

Before Eurovision

GO Malta EuroSong 2009 
GO Malta EuroSong 2009 was the national final format developed by PBS to select the Maltese entry for the Eurovision Song Contest 2009. The competition consisted of a semi-final held between 8 November 2008 and 10 January 2009, and a final held on 7 February 2009. The semi-final took place at the Audiovision TV Studios in Hamrun and hosted by Valerie Vella, while the final took place at the Malta Fairs & Convention Centre in Ta' Qali and hosted by Pablo Micallef and Valerie Vella. All shows were broadcast on Television Malta (TVM).

Format 
The competition consisted of fifty-six songs competing in the semi-final which consisted of eight shows titled Euro Showbox between 8 November 2008 and 10 January 2009. Seven songs were presented in each show and a total of twenty entries qualified to compete in the final on 7 February 2009. In the semi-final, six judges evaluated the songs and each judge had an equal stake in the final result. Fifteen of the entries were the songs that received the highest scores from the judges, while the remaining five entries were selected based on the results of the public televote from the remaining forty-one entries. The final consisted of two rounds: the first round selected the top three entries based on the votes of five judges in addition to the jury and televoting results of the semi-final, while the second round (superfinal) determined the winner exclusively by public televoting.

Competing entries 
Artists and composers were able to submit their entries between 13 and 14 October 2008. Songwriters from any nationality were able to submit songs as long as the artist were Maltese or possessed Maltese citizenship. Songwriters were able to submit as many songs as they wished, however, artists were only able to submit a maximum of two songs and could only compete with a maximum of one in the final. 182 entries were received by the broadcaster and 80 entries had been shortlisted to progress through the selection process. The fifty-six songs selected to compete in the semi-final were announced on 27 October 2008.

Among the selected competing artists were former Maltese Eurovision entrants Georgina who represented Malta in the 1991 contest, Miriam Christine who represented Malta in the 1996 contest, Chiara who represented Malta in the 1998 and 2005 contests, and Ludwig Galea who represented Malta in the 2004 contest. Among the songwriters, Alfred C. Sant, Jason Paul Cassar, Ray Agius, Gerard James Borg and Philip Vella were all past writers of Maltese Eurovision entries. Paul Giordimaina represented Malta in the 1991 edition. Marc Paelinck co-wrote the Belgian entries in 2002 and 2004; Rafael Artesero co-wrote the Andorran entries in 2005 and 2006; Ralph Siegel and Bernd Meinunger co-wrote eighteen entries for various countries.

Shows

Semi-final 
The semi-final took place over the eight shows of Euro Showbox between 8 November 2008 and 10 January 2009. Fifty-six songs competed for twenty qualifying spots in the final, which were announced during the last show of Euro Showbox on 10 January 2009. The allocation of the seven entries competing in each show was announced on 2 November 2008. Due to incorrect SMS numbers being displayed during the first show, a revote took place at the beginning of the second show. The six members of the jury that evaluated the entries during the semi-final consisted of:

 Kevin Abela (Malta) – Principal Trumpet of the Malta Philharmonic Orchestra and music director
 Munro Forbes (Cyprus) – Producer of various Eurovision Song Contest and Junior Eurovision Song Contest events
 Pascal-Emmanuel Luneau (France) – Musician, screenwriter, composer, author and vocal coach
 Ray Mangion (Malta) – Producer, artistic director and performer
 Denise Mulholland (United Kingdom) – Director and actress
 Marco Vannuzzi (Italy) – Music manager

Final
The final took place on 7 February 2009. The twenty entries that qualified from the semi-final were performed again and the winner was determined over two rounds of voting. In the first round, after the votes of a five-member jury panel were combined with the results of the jury and public televote in the semi-final, the top three entries were selected to qualify to the second round, the superfinal. In the superfinal, the winner was determined solely by a public televote. The show was opened with a guest performance by the Yada Dance Company, while the interval act featured performances by 2008 Maltese Eurovision entrant Morena, 2009 Turkish Eurovision entrant Hadise, 2009 British Eurovision entrants Jade Ewen and Andrew Lloyd Webber, and the local acts Niki Gravino, Airport Impressions, Crisitina Casolani and Toby, and The Riffs. After the results of the public televote were announced, "What If We" performed by Chiara was the winner. Among the five members of the jury that evaluated the entries during the final were former Eurovision entrants Linda Martin who represented Ireland and won the 1992 contest, and Nicki French who represented United Kingdom in the 2000 contest.

Promotion 
Chiara made several appearances across Europe to specifically promote "What If We" as the Maltese Eurovision entry. On 18 February, Chiara performed during the Greek Eurovision national final. On 1 March, she performed during the presentation show of the 2009 Bosnian Eurovision entry, BH Eurosong 2009. Chiara also completed promotional activities in Belgium following her performances in Greece and Bosnia and Herzegovina. On 18 April, Chiara performed during the Eurovision in Concert event which was held at the Amsterdam Marcanti venue in Amsterdam, Netherlands and hosted by Marga Bult and Maggie MacNeal.

At Eurovision 
The Eurovision Song Contest 2009 took place at the Olimpiysky Arena in Moscow, Russia and consisted of two semi-finals on 12 and 14 May, and the final of 16 May 2009. According to Eurovision rules, all nations with the exceptions of the host country and the "Big Four" (France, Germany, Spain and the United Kingdom) are required to qualify from one of two semi-finals in order to compete for the final; the top nine songs from each semi-final as determined by televoting progress to the final, and a tenth was determined by back-up juries. The European Broadcasting Union (EBU) split up the competing countries into six different pots based on voting patterns from previous contests, with countries with favourable voting histories put into the same pot. On 30 January 2009, a special allocation draw was held which placed each country into one of the two semi-finals. Malta was placed into the first semi-final, to be held on 12 May 2009. The running order for the semi-finals was decided through another draw on 16 March 2009 and Malta was set to perform in position 17, following the entry from Portugal and before the entry from Bosnia and Herzegovina.

The two semi-finals and the final were broadcast in Malta on TVM with commentary by Valerie Vella. The Maltese spokesperson, who announced the Maltese votes during the final, was Pauline Agius.

Semi-final 
Chiara took part in technical rehearsals on 4 and 8 May, followed by dress rehearsals on 11 and 12 May. The Maltese performance featured Chiara wearing a black dress with Swarovski crystals, designed by Maltese fashion brand Charles and Ron, and performing alone on stage. The background LED screens projected a starry night with a mixture of darker and lighter shades in blue colours. The performance was originally to have featured smoke effects, however, the Maltese delegation opted not to use the effect in the broadcast performance.

At the end of the show, Malta was announced as having finished in the top 10 and consequently qualifying for the grand final. It was later revealed that Malta placed sixth in the semi-final, receiving a total of 86 points.

Final 
Shortly after the first semi-final, a winners' press conference was held for the ten qualifying countries. As part of this press conference, the qualifying artists took part in a draw to determine which half of the grand final they would subsequently participate in. This draw was done in the order the countries appeared in the semi-final running order. Malta was drawn to perform in position 14, following the entry from Moldova and before the entry from Estonia.

Chiara once again took part in dress rehearsals on 15 and 16 May before the final, including the jury final where the professional juries cast their final votes before the live show. Chiara performed a repeat of her semi-final performance during the final on 16 May. Malta placed twenty-second in the final, scoring 31 points.

Voting 
The voting system for 2009 involved each country awarding points from 1-8, 10 and 12, with the points in the final being decided by a combination of 50% national jury and 50% televoting. Each nation's jury consisted of five music industry professionals who are citizens of the country they represent. This jury judged each entry based on: vocal capacity; the stage performance; the song's composition and originality; and the overall impression by the act. In addition, no member of a national jury was permitted to be related in any way to any of the competing acts in such a way that they cannot vote impartially and independently.

Following the release of the full split voting by the EBU after the conclusion of the competition, it was revealed that Malta had placed twenty-fourth with the public televote and thirteenth with the jury vote in the final. In the public vote, Malta scored 18 points, while with the jury vote, Malta scored 87 points.

Below is a breakdown of points awarded to Estonia and awarded by Malta in the first semi-final and grand final of the contest, and the breakdown of the jury voting and televoting conducted during the two shows:

Points awarded to Malta

Points awarded by Malta

Detailed voting results

Notes

References

External links
 EuroSong Official Website
 Chiara at Eurovision 2009 Blog Post

2009
Countries in the Eurovision Song Contest 2009
Eurovision